Selvanus Geh (born 27 November 1993) is an Indonesian badminton player specializes in doubles from Hi-Qua Wima Surabaya club. He won boys' doubles bronze medals at the 2011 Asian and World Junior Championships. Partnered with Kevin Sanjaya Sukamuljo, Geh won a Grand Prix title at the 2014 New Zealand Open.

Achievements

BWF World Junior Championships 
Boys' doubles

Asian Junior Championships 
Boys' doubles

BWF Grand Prix (1 title, 2 runners-up) 
The BWF Grand Prix had two levels, the Grand Prix and Grand Prix Gold. It was a series of badminton tournaments sanctioned by the Badminton World Federation (BWF) and played between 2007 and 2017.

Men's doubles

  BWF Grand Prix Gold tournament
  BWF Grand Prix tournament

BWF International Challenge/Series (3 titles, 1 runner-up) 
Men's doubles

  BWF International Challenge tournament
  BWF International Series tournament

References 

1993 births
Living people
People from Samarinda
Sportspeople from East Kalimantan
Indonesian people of Chinese descent
Indonesian male badminton players
Indonesian Christians